Silent Library is an American reality television series which premiered on MTV on June 15, 2009 in the United States.

Series overview

Episodes

Season 1 (2009)

Season 2 (2010)

Season 3 (2010)

Season 4 (2011)

Silent Library